Suba is a 2010 Sri Lankan Sinhala drama film directed by Ariyadasa Peiris and co-produced by K.R. Siriwardana, Ajith Kulathunga, W.R. Dammika, Swetha De Silva and Ariyadasa Peiris for Charithamali Films. It stars Muthu Tharanga and Manjula Moragaha in lead roles along with Cletus Mendis and Sanoja Bibile. Music composed by Rohana Weerasinghe. It is the 1146th Sri Lankan film in the Sinhala cinema.

Cast
 Muthu Tharanga
 Manjula Moragaha
 Cletus Mendis
 Apsara Boteju
 Sanoja Bibile
 Sandun Wijesiri
 Jeevan Handunneththi
 Ranjith Peiris
 Premadasa Vithanage
 Gratiel Chitrangani

References

2010 films
2010s Sinhala-language films